Reboot is an American comedy series created by Steven Levitan. It premiered September 20, 2022, on Hulu. The series follows the dysfunctional cast of an early 2000s hit sitcom, Step Right Up, who must face their unresolved issues and navigate a vastly different media and entertainment environment when a young writer successfully pitches a reboot of their show. The series stars Keegan-Michael Key and Johnny Knoxville.

In January 2023, despite being positively received and being nominated for two Critics' Choice Awards, Hulu opted to cancel the series after one season.

Cast

Main 

 Keegan-Michael Key as Reed Sterling, the Yale-trained actor who played "Lawrence", the stepfather on Step Right Up, before leaving the show to pursue a failed career in theater and film. 
 Johnny Knoxville as Clay Barber, the actor and raunchy stand-up comedian who played "Jake", the ex-husband in Step Right Up and is now dealing with a lifetime of alcoholism, drug abuse, and repeated arrests for minor crimes.
 Rachel Bloom as Hannah Korman, an up-and-coming indie film screenwriter who lands a deal with Hulu to revive Step Right Up but is forced into the role of co-showrunner with the sitcom's creator, Gordon, who is her estranged father.
 Calum Worthy as Zack Jackson, the former child actor who played "Cody", the son on Step Right Up, before going on to a brief career as the leading man in a series of low-budget teen movies.
 Krista Marie Yu as Elaine Kim, the inexperienced studio executive tasked with overseeing the revival of Step Right Up.
 Judy Greer as Bree Marie Jensen, the actress who played "Josie", the mother on Step Right Up, then retired from acting when she married the duke of a small Nordic country before losing all of her money in their divorce.
 Paul Reiser as Gordon Gelman, the aging writer who originally created Step Right Up and maintains the rights to the show, allowing him to co-opt Hannah as lead showrunner.

Recurring 
 Eliza Coupe as Nora, Reed's girlfriend and a successful playwright
 Alyah Chanelle Scott as Timberly Fox, a former reality show contestant who plays "Whitney", the adult daughter of Reed's character Lawrence.
 Lawrence Pressman as Jerry, the former director of episodes from the original Step Right Up who returns to direct episodes in the reboot
 Ryan Dietz as Dennis, the first AD of "Step Right Up"
 Fred Melamed, Rose Abdoo and George Wyner as Alan, Selma and Bob, older and experienced comedy writers brought in by Gordon
 Kimia Behpoornia, Korama Danquah and Dan Leahy as Azmina, Janae and Benny, young and socially conscious comedy writers brought in by Hannah

Guest 
 Kerri Kenney as Susan, Zack's mother
 Robert Clendenin as Dougie, a struggling actor and old friend of Clay's
 Esther Povitsky as Marcy, Zack's ex-girlfriend
 Stephanie Allynne as Mallory, a Hulu HR representative
 Peter Gallagher as Tyler, the new president of Hulu

Episodes

Production

Development
On August 5, 2021, the series was given a pilot order by Hulu, and on January 11, 2022, was given a series order. On January 30, 2023, Hulu canceled the series after one season, with the series planning to be shopped to other networks. On February 8, 2023, it was reported the series is officially dead after it failed to find a new home.

Casting
Alongside the series announcement, it was confirmed that Keegan-Michael Key and Johnny Knoxville would star in the series. On September 22, 2021, it was announced that Leslie Bibb would join the series as Bree, alongside Rachel Bloom as Hannah, Michael McKean as Gordon, Krista Marie Yu as Elaine, and Calum Worthy as Zack. On January 11, 2022, it was announced that Judy Greer had replaced Bibb as Bree Marie Jensen. In February 2022, it was reported that Paul Reiser would play the role of Gordon in the series, replacing McKean.

Release 
In The US, Reboot streams on Hulu. Internationally the series premiered on Disney+ as  Star Original.

Reception

Audience viewership 
According to the streaming aggregator Reelgood, Reboot was the 9th most streamed program across all platforms, during the week of September 22, 2022, to September 28, 2022. According to the streaming aggregator JustWatch, Reboot was the 4th most streamed television series across all platforms in the United States, during the week of September 25, 2022. According to Whip Media, Reboot was the 7th most streamed original series in the United States, during the week of October 9, 2022, the 6th during the week of October 16, 2022, the 7th during the week of October 23, 2022, and the 5th during the week of October 30, 2022.

Critical response 
The review aggregator website Rotten Tomatoes reported a 85% approval rating with an average rating of 6.9/10, based on 33 critic reviews. The website's critics consensus reads, "Reboot hardly reinvents the Hollywood satire with its meta jokes that could have used more bite, but its more conventional qualities—namely a delightful cast—make for a mirthful enough watch." Metacritic, which uses a weighted average, assigned a score of 70 out of 100 based on 22 critics, indicating "generally favorable reviews".

Accolades

References

External links
 
 

2020s American comedy television series
English-language television shows
Hulu original programming
2022 American television series debuts
2022 American television series endings
Television series about television
Television series by Steven Levitan Productions
Television series by 20th Century Fox Television
Television shows featuring audio description